Marián Geišberg (23 December 1953 – 10 November 2018) was a Slovak actor. Geišberg was recognised in 2001 for his stage acting in the Jozef Kroner Awards. His son is Slovak actor Marek Geišberg.

Selected filmography 
She Grazed Horses on Concrete (1982)
 (2006)
Music (2008)
Janosik: A True Story (2009)
Revival (2013)
A Step into the Dark (2014)
Three Brothers (2014)
The Seven Ravens (2015)
A Vote for the King of the Romans (2016)
 (2018)

References

External links

1953 births
2018 deaths
People from Piešťany
Slovak male film actors
Slovak male stage actors
Slovak male television actors
20th-century Slovak male actors
21st-century Slovak male actors
Sun in a Net Awards winners